Dămuc is a commune in Neamț County, Romania. It is composed of three villages: Dămuc, Huisurez (Hosszúrez) and Trei Fântâni (Háromkút). Dămuc is one of three communes in Neamț County (most of which is in Western Moldavia) that are part of the historic region of Transylvania.

References

Communes in Neamț County
Localities in Transylvania